"Stepping Stone" is a song co-written and recorded by American country music artist Lari White.  It was released in May 1998 as the first single and title track from the album Stepping Stone.  The song reached number 16 on the Billboard Hot Country Singles & Tracks chart.  It was written by White, David Kent and Craig Wiseman.

Content
At the time of the song's writing, White had left her previous record deal with RCA Records Nashville when co-writer David Kent e-mailed her a poem titled "Stepping Stone". She and Craig Wiseman later finished the song. Upon her singing with Lyric Street Records in early 1998, the label selected "Stepping Stone" as a single, thus making it the label's first release.

Chart performance

Year-end charts

References

1998 songs
Lari White songs
Songs written by Craig Wiseman
Song recordings produced by Dann Huff
Lyric Street Records singles
1998 singles
Songs written by Lari White